Roller Derby Girl is a 1949 short American film directed by Justin Herman.

Cast 
Jean Porter
Toughie Brasuhn

Awards 
Justin Herman was nominated for an Academy Award for "Best Short Subject, One-reel".

References

External links 

1949 films
Paramount Pictures short films
American black-and-white films
Roller derby films
1940s English-language films